Mullah Naqib Alikozai, sometimes called Naqibullah (c.1950 – 11 October 2007), was an Afghan mujahideen commander and politician from the Kandahar area of southern Afghanistan. He was the leader of the Alikozai Pashtun tribe.

Mujahideen commander
Mullah Naqib gained respect as a military leader during the Soviet–Afghan War, when he fought against Soviet and Afghan communist forces. In 1984, he became affiliated with the Jamiat-e Islami party of Burhanuddin Rabbani. The Jamiat was often perceived as having a constituency limited to the Tajik community, so Rabbani was especially careful to cultivate his relations with the few Pashtun commanders willing to join him, such as Mullah Naqib.

Naqib's forces built a fortified base in the Arghandab district, that the government troops repeatedly, and unsuccessfully tried to destroy. In June 1987, a large force of government troops, spearheaded by tanks and supported by Soviet artillery attacked into Arghandab. After a week of hard fighting in the "green zone", the dense agricultural area along the Arghandab valley, the force approached the main mujahideen at Chaharqulba. Dismayed by their inability to stop the advancing armour, some mujahideen commanders suggested to Naqib that they should withdraw. A commander described the interview: Finally, we Mujahideen commanders went to Naqib and said that we are outnumbered and should leave the base. Naqib said that this is their last battle and will decide the contest between them and us.[...] We replied that the RPGs were not working against the sandbagged tanks. Naqib took an RPG and strode out to the forward positions to kill a tank. We commanders stopped him and promised to fight to the end.
Eventually, the government troops withdrew, having suffered heavy casualties.

Mullah Naqib is also said to have personally shot down three Mi-24 gunships using Stinger missiles supplied by the CIA. His military record gave him a heroic status among the local population.

Mullah Naqib by his own admission executed at least thirty suspected traitors or captured enemy soldiers.

Later career
After the collapse of the communist regime in 1992, the mujahideen took control of Kandahar. Gul Agha Sherzai was nominally the governor but he lacked authority, as each group sought to carve itself a territory to control.
Mullah Naqib was the most powerful commander in the city, and many of his subordinates turned to illegal taxation and theft, in order to earn an income. The situation remained calm until 1993, when sporadic clashes erupted between different factions.

The lawlessness in Kandahar paved the way for the rise of the Taliban movement. On November 3, 1994, Mullah Naqib and his 2,500 men did not resist the advance of the Taliban, allowing them to capture the city, and, in exchange, he was permitted to retire safely into his bastion in Arghandab. This led to widespread suspicions that he had been bribed, but there is also evidence that he was acting under orders from Rabbani, the President in Kabul.

Role in post-Taliban Afghanistan
Mullah Naqib reemerged as the Taliban regime began to dissolve following the 2001 US invasion of Afghanistan.
He managed to broker a deal between Hamid Karzai and Taliban leader Mullah Omar, allowing the surrender of 3,000 militants in Kandahar. However, his rivalry with Gul Agha Sherzai also resurfaced, and their forces clashed, as Sherzai's men seized several key positions, with the support of US airstrikes. Karzai later defused the situation, by
brokering a power shareout agreement, whereby Sherzai was made governor, and the post of vice-governor was attributed to Naqib, who gave it to his brother-in-law.
Americans and their Afghan allies suspected Naquib of helping Mullah Omar escape Kandahar before they arrived. Even though Omar had handed over Kandahar over to Naquib, the night before Omar was to surrender, him and other senior Taliban leaders disappeared. Naqib denies having any knowledge of how Omar escaped.

After once again retiring to his tribal area in Arghandab, Mullah Naqib became a powerful asset for the government in its struggle against the Taliban. His tribal militia prevented them from gaining influence in the Arghandab district, that is considered critical to the defense of Kandahar. He thus became a prime objective for Taliban assassins, who targeted him with a bombing attack in early March 2007, leaving him badly injured. After receiving treatment for several months in India, Naqib returned to Afghanistan, to witness a deteriorating security situation. He warned of an impending Taliban attack, and advised against the planned withdrawal of Canadian ISAF troops form Kandahar province, scheduled for 2009.

Naqib died of a heart attack on October 11, 2007. Thousands of people, including President Hamid Karzai, attended his funeral. His death was severe blow to the U.S-led coalition and to the Afghan government, that left the Arghandab district open to attack by the Taliban.

References

External links

Politicians of Kandahar Province
People of the Soviet–Afghan War
Afghan expatriates in Pakistan
1950s births
2007 deaths
Pashtun people
Jamiat-e Islami politicians